Bulinus camerunensis is a species of small air-breathing freshwater snail with a sinistral shell, an aquatic pulmonate gastropod mollusk in the family Planorbidae, the ramshorn snails and their allies.

This species is endemic to Lake Barombi Koto and Lake Debundsha in Cameroon.

References

Bulinus
Endemic fauna of Cameroon
Gastropods described in 1957
Taxonomy articles created by Polbot